Constant Kusters (born 12 December 1970 in Oosterbeek) is a Dutch politician. He is chairman of the Dutch People's Union. This party has been mainly known for its Neo-Nazi conceptions.

References

External links
 *
 "Constant Kusters his returns for libel" - De Gelderlander
 ""You know extreme: integration. Dat is legale volkerenmoord' Constant Kusters, leider van de Nederlandse Volksunie That is legal genocide "Constant Kusters, leader of the Dutch People's Union" - Trouw

1970 births
Living people
Dutch neo-Nazis
Party chairs of the Netherlands
People from Renkum
Neo-Nazi politicians